Yelena Viktorovna Valyushkina (also tr. Elena; ; born on 8 December 1962) is a Soviet and Russian theatre and film actress. Honoured Artist of the Russian Federation (1995).

Biography 
Born into a military family. After her family returned from the GDR, she spent part of her childhood in the city of Biysk, Altai Territory. In high school, she lived with her grandmother in Tomilino. While studying in high school, she studied at music (piano, guitar), dance and art schools.

In 1984 she graduated from the Mikhail Shchepkin Higher Theatre School (course of Viktor Korshunov, Vladimir Sulimov).

From January 1984 to the present, she has been an actress at the Mossovet Theatre.

While studying at the drama school, in 1982 she made her film debut, starring in the comedy I Don't Want to Be an Adult. And immediately after graduating from college, in 1984, she got her second, but immediately the main role   Maria in Mark Zakharov's musical comedy Formula of Love ​​a charming, big-eyed girl who was not afraid to go with Count Cagliostro to cure daddy.

This role brought popularity, she began to receive many offers to act in films, but devoted herself to the theatre, playing in the cinema over the next 15 years only a few minor and episodic roles. In the theatre, the actress has played more than thirty major roles.

In addition to working in the theatre, she voiced cartoons, worked in the television program "Road Patrol" on TV-6 channel, paired with Sergei Kolesnikov (in the credits of the program she was listed as Elena Yatsko). Since 2013, at one time she hosted the TV show "Battle of Psychics". In 2016, she starred in an advertisement for "Saturday Evening" on the Russia-1 TV channel as a cleaner.

In 2013, director Zhora Kryzhovnikov in his film Kiss Them All! invited to be the mother of the bride. Having played her, the actress was nominated for the Golden Eagle Award for Best Supporting Actress.

Personal life 
After graduating from college, she married her teacher Leonid Fomin. The marriage lasted eleven years.

Her second husband is Aleksandr Yatsko, Soviet and Russian theatre and film actor, director, Honoured Artist of the Russian Federation (2005). They got married in 1994 and worked together at the Mossovet Theatre, but divorced 20 years later.

Valyushkina has two children, Vasily and Maria.

Valyushkina's hobbies include painting furniture, weaving beads, sewing and designing. As well as her native Russian, she speaks English, Spanish and French. She lives in Moscow.

Selected filmography

References

External links 

 Официальный сайт Елены Валюшкиной 
 Интервью в «МК-Бульвар». «Мой муж не романтик. Этим он меня и привлёк» // womanhit.ru (11 апреля 2007 года) 
 Интервью в «МК-Бульвар». «Художник. Сыгравшая прекрасную Марию в „Формуле любви“ актриса Елена Валюшкина — мастерица на все руки». // womanhit.ru (2 декабря 2002 года) 
 Первый канал. Программа «Наедине со всеми. Елена Валюшкина» (эфир — 27 января 2014 года) // 1tv.ru
 Елена Валюшкина на сайте Театра имени Моссовета. Роли в театре, текущий репертуар. // mossoveta.ru

1962 births
Living people
20th-century Russian actresses
21st-century Russian actresses
Honored Artists of the Russian Federation
Russian television actresses
Russian stage actresses
Russian film actresses
People from Potsdam